Mario Longhi is a Brazilian American businessman who was the CEO of U.S. Steel, based in Pittsburgh, Pennsylvania, US.  He was promoted to CEO in September 2013 after the retirement of John P. Surma and after Longhi had completed 15 months as an executive of the corporation. He retired in June 2017 and was succeeded by David Burritt.

Prior to his service at U.S. Steel, Longhi served as CEO of Gerdau Ameristeel Corporation from 2006-2011.

A native from Tatuí, Brazil and son of Italian immigrants, he obtained both undergraduate and master's degrees in metallurgical engineering from Instituto Mauá de Tecnologia.  After graduating, Longhi worked for Alcoa for 23 years.

References

Living people
Businesspeople from São Paulo
Brazilian people of Italian descent
Brazilian chief executives
Brazilian emigrants to the United States
Businesspeople from Pittsburgh
American people of Italian descent
American chief executives of manufacturing companies
American steel industry businesspeople
Year of birth missing (living people)